Aberdeen Falls is a  high waterfall on the Kehelgamu Oya near Ginigathena, in the Nuwara Eliya District of Sri Lanka. Aberdeen is named after Aberdeen, the third largest city in Scotland and the capital of Aberdeenshire. Kehelgamu Oya is a major tributary of the Kelani River. 

To reach Aberdeen Falls from Ginigathena town, one then must proceed along Ambatale Road up to the Buddha statue at the end of the road. Then one should park their vehicle and walk about 1.2 km along the road. Bathing in the middle of the pool and swimming to the middle has caused death to swimmers in the past. This waterfall is covered with a big stone complex behind. The waterfall is ranked as the 18th highest on the Island.

See also 
 Locations in Sri Lanka with a Scottish name
 List of waterfalls of Sri Lanka

Notes

References 

Waterfalls of Sri Lanka
Landforms of Nuwara Eliya District
Waterfalls in Central Province, Sri Lanka